Institutions are social constructs, both cultural and organizational.

Institution or institutions may also refer to:

 Formal organizations
 The buildings maintained by such organizations, particularly:
 Mental asylums
 Jails
 Institutions in computer science

See also

 Institutions of Grammar, the standard medieval text on Latin grammar, written by Priscian in late antiquity
 
 
 Institute (disambiguation)